Lorenzo's Oil is a 1992 American drama film directed and co-written by George Miller. It is based on the true story of Augusto and Michaela Odone, parents who search for a cure for their son Lorenzo's adrenoleukodystrophy (ALD), leading to the development of Lorenzo's oil. The film was shot in Pittsburgh, Pennsylvania, primarily from September 1991 to February 1992. It had a limited release in North America on December 30, 1992, with a nationwide release two weeks later, on January 15, 1993. Though it was a box office disappointment, grossing $7.2 million against its $30 million budget, the film was generally well received by the critics and garnered two nominations at the 65th Academy Awards.

Plot

Lorenzo is a bright and vibrant young boy living in the Comoro Islands, as his father Augusto Odone works for the World Bank and is stationed there. However, after relocating with his parents to the United States, he begins to show signs of neurological problems (such as falling, loss of hearing, tantrums, etc.). The boy is diagnosed as having adrenoleukodystrophy (ALD), which is fatal within two years. Failing to find a doctor capable of treating their son's rare disease, Augusto and his wife, Michaela, set out on a mission to find a treatment to save their son. In their quest, the Odones clash with doctors, scientists and a support group that is skeptical that anything could be done about ALD, much less by laypeople. But they persist, setting up camp in medical libraries, reviewing animal experiments, enlisting the aid of Professor Gus Nikolais, badgering researchers, questioning top doctors all over the world and even organizing an international symposium about the disease.

Despite research dead-ends, the horror of watching their son's health decline and being surrounded by skeptics (including the coordinators of the support group they attend), they persist until they finally hit upon a possible therapy. The Odones sponsor an international meeting of scientists doing research on ALD, requiring two conditions ahead of time. First they insist that the meeting focus on potential treatments and second, they require that they be allowed to participate, despite being non-scientist laypeople. The pivotal scene in the movie portrays this meeting, in which the scientists are presenting their research. When Dr. William B. Rizzo mentions his studies in which the addition of oleic acid to cultured cells blocked accumulation of the factors which cause ALD, the Odones jump into the conversation, asking if this oil might help their son. Although the scientists play down their hope, pointing out that it would take years of work to produce the oil and test in clinical trials, the Odones seize the promise of this possible curative treatment. As the scene ends, Michaela Odone is shown beginning the effort to find someone able and willing to produce the same oil Dr. Rizzo gave to his cells. They contact over 100 firms around the world until they find an elderly British chemist, Don Suddaby, who is working for Croda International and is willing to take on the challenge of distilling the proper formula.

The Odones obtain a precious vial of the oil (actually containing two specific long chain fatty acids, isolated from rapeseed oil and olive oil) and add it to their son's diet. This treatment proves successful in normalizing the accumulation of the very long chain fatty acids (which had been causing their son's steady decline), as measured in blood levels. This treatment halts the progression of his disease and is dubbed "Lorenzo's Oil". This oil is soon found to be successful in preventing the progression of harm in other patients with ALD. Meanwhile, Lorenzo has a great deal of neurological damage, and the Odones are dismayed to see that the oil can reverse their son's symptoms only very, very slowly. The Odones realize that more rapid improvement of his son's severe condition will require treatments to repair the myelin sheath (a lipid insulator) around the nerves, and Augusto is shown taking on the new challenge of organizing biomedical efforts to heal myelin damage in patients.

Finally, Lorenzo, at the age of 14, shows definite improvement (swallowing for himself and answering "yes" or "no" questions by blinking) and it is revealed that he has regained his sight, can move his head from side to side, vocalize simple sounds and is learning to use a computer. The movie ends with scenes of ALD patients who were treated with Lorenzo's Oil earlier in the course of their disease. In these patients the devastating neurological degeneration from which Lorenzo suffered was able to be prevented.

Cast

Production
Principal photography for Lorenzo's Oil began on September 9, 1991 in Ben Avon, Pennsylvania.

Possibly to emphasize the “everyman" aspect of the plot (the notion that a cure could affect families and individuals anywhere), many smaller roles were played by inexperienced actors or non-actors with unusual physical features and mannerisms. For example, the poet James Merrill was noticed by a casting director at a New York public reading of his poetry. His rarefied speaking cadences were utilized in a symposium scene in which he played a questioning doctor.

Music
The film uses Allegri's Miserere, Edward Elgar's cello concerto, as well as Barber's Adagio for Strings and Mozart's Ave verum corpus K.618.

The opening song is "Kijana Mwana Mwali" (Swahili, "Song about a Young Lady"), sung by the Gonda Traditional Entertainers.

A 1960 recording of Maria Callas with the La Scala orchestra and chorus is heard singing selections from Bellini's Norma at several points.

The music for the Easter Midnight Mass scene is a Russian Orthodox Church hymn, "Bogoroditse Devo" (Rejoice, O Virgin) from "Three Choruses from 'Tsar Feodor Ioannovich'", taken from the album Sacred Songs of Russia by Gloriae Dei Cantores.

Other music include Barber's Agnus Dei and Mahler's Symphony No. 5.

Reception

Critical response
Roger Ebert of the Chicago Sun Times gave the film four out of four stars and called it an "immensely moving and challenging movie", adding that "it was impossible not to get swept up in it." James Berardinelli of ReelViews gave it three out of four stars and claimed, "it was about the war for knowledge and the victory of hope through perseverance."

Review aggregation website Rotten Tomatoes retrospectively collected reviews from 39 critics to give the film a score of 92%, with an average rating of 7.10/10, . The website's consensus reads, "A harrowing tribute to the heroism of parental love, Lorenzo's Oil is kept from abject misery by George Miller's sensitive direction and outstanding performances from Nick Nolte and Susan Sarandon." On Metacritic, the film has a weighted average score of 80 out of 100, based on 21 critics, indicating "generally favorable reviews". Audiences polled by CinemaScore gave the film a grade of "A" on an A+ to F scale.

Medical response
Though the film seemed to accurately portray the events related to the boy's condition and his parents' efforts during the time period covered by the film, it was criticized for falsely painting a picture of a miracle cure. Subsequent research with Lorenzo's oil has not clearly proven its long-term effectiveness in treating ALD after its onset. The actual subject of the film, Lorenzo Odone, died of pneumonia in May 2008 at the age of 30, having lived two decades longer than originally predicted by doctors.

Hugo Moser, on whom the character of Professor Nikolais was based, called the film's portrayal of that character "an abomination".

Box office
The film grossed $7,286,388 domestically with a budget of around $30 million.

Accolades

Also, the film is recognized by American Film Institute in these lists:
 2006: AFI's 100 Years...100 Cheers – Nominated

See also
  Voglia di vivere, a 1990 Italian television film depicting the same story.
  Lorenzo, a song by Phil Collins, released on the 1996 album Dance into the Light, is based on a poem Michaela Odone wrote about Lorenzo.
 Extraordinary Measures, a 2010 film depicting the true story of another set of parents' struggle to find a cure for their children's rare disease.

References

External links

 
 
 
 Lorenzo's Oil at Oz Movies

1992 films
1990s English-language films
1992 drama films
Drama films based on actual events
Films directed by George Miller
Films produced by George Miller
Films set in the Comoros
Films set in Pittsburgh
Films shot in Pittsburgh
Medical-themed films
Universal Pictures films
Films produced by Doug Mitchell
Films with screenplays by George Miller
Films set in the 1980s
Films set in the 1990s
Films about mother–son relationships
Films about father–son relationships
American drama films
American films based on actual events
1990s American films
Films about disability